Purbasthali College, established in 2009, is an undergraduate general and honours degree college in Parulia in Purbasthali II CD Block in  Purba Bardhaman district. It offers undergraduate courses in arts. It is affiliated to  University of Burdwan.

Departments

Arts
 Bengali
English
History
Philosophy
Political Science
Sanskrit
Education

See also

References

External links
 Purbasthali College

Colleges affiliated to University of Burdwan
Educational institutions established in 2009
Universities and colleges in Purba Bardhaman district
2009 establishments in West Bengal